"Ek Sur" or "Mile Sur Mera Tumhara" as it is better known, is an Indian song and accompanying video promoting national integration and unity in diversity.

The concept for Mile Sur was developed in 1988 by Lok Seva Sanchar Parishad and promoted by Doordarshan (then India's sole TV broadcaster) and India's Ministry of Information. The song was composed by Bhimsen Joshi and arranged by Louis Banks, with lyrics by Piyush Pandey (then an account manager and presently the executive chairman and creative head of Ogilvy and Mather, India). The project was conceived by Suresh Mallik and Kailash Surendranath, was directed by Surendranath and recorded by people from all walks of life, including a supergroup of Indian celebrities—musicians, sports persons, movie stars, etc.

The national integration video was intended to instill a sense of pride and promote unity amongst Indians, highlighting India's different linguistic communities and societies—India's unity in diversity, so to speak.

Mile Sur was telecast for the first time on Independence Day, 1988, after the telecast of the Prime Minister's speech from the ramparts of the Red Fort.

A recreated version of the song was composed by film musicians Sachin Sanghvi and Jigar Saraiya, rewritten by Saraiya, Vaibhav "Vayu" Shrivastava and I.P. Singh, and crooned by Sanghvi, Saraiya, Vayu, Singh, Navraj Hans, Shalmali Kholgade, Divya Kumar, Rakesh Maini and Shashwat Singh for the 2020 dance drama Street Dancer 3D, directed by Remo D'Souza and starring Varun Dhawan and Shraddha Kapoor in the lead roles.

Languages used
Hindi (Pandit Bhimsenji and Lataji's parts, among others), and alphabetically the others were: Assamese, Bengali, Gujarati, Kannada, Kashmiri, Malayalam, Marathi, Odia, Punjabi, Sindhi, Tamil, Telugu, and Urdu. (Among the languages present, then in 1988, in the Eighth Schedule of the Constitution of India).

Cast
 Singers and musicians: Pandit Bhimsen Joshi, Vidwaan Sri M Balamuralikrishna, Lata Mangeshkar, Kavita Krishnamurthy, Shubhangi Bose, Suchitra Mitra, R A Rama Mani, Ananda Shankar
 Poets: Nirendranath Chakravarty, Sunil Gangopadhyay, Javed Akhtar
 Actors: Amitabh Bacchan, Jeetendra, Mithun Chakraborty, Sharmila Tagore, Hema Malini, Tanuja, Kamal Haasan, Meenakshi Seshadri,Saira Banu, Revathi, K.R. Vijaya, Waheeda Rehman, Shabana Azmi, Deepa Sahi, Om Puri, Bhisham Sahni, Amrish Puri, Dina Pathak, Harish Patel, Virendra Saxena, Suhasini, Uttam Mohanty, Pratap Pothen, Geetanjali
Cricketers: Narendra Hirwani, Arun Lal, Syed Kirmani
Footballers: Pradip Kumar Banerjee, Chuni Goswami Saira Banu

Hockey-Players: Leslie Claudius, Gurbux Singh
Badminton-Player: Prakash Padukone
 Dancers: Sudharani Raghupathy, Amala Shankar, Mallika Sarabhai
 Others: cartoonist Mario Miranda, filmmaker Mrinal Sen

Production
It is widely reported that the idea for the song was formed by Rajiv Gandhi and Jaideep Samarth, who was the brother of actresses Tanuja and Nutan and a senior executive at Ogilvy Bensom & Mather (OBM). Samarth approached Suresh Mullick with the proposal made by Doordarshan to create a film on the unity of India with a planned release date of 15 August 1988. Mullick had previously worked with Kailash Surendranath on the successful national integration film of 1985, Torch of Freedom (or Freedom Run), and thus chose him to produce the film. Mullick and Surendranath then approached Pandit Bhimsen Joshi who immediately agreed. Mullick decided to fuse together Carnatic and Hindustani classical music with modern music for the same, choosing Raga Bhairavi as the base (as per Pandit Joshi's suggestion). The lyrics were written by a young Piyush Pandey and were approved after seventeen other drafts were rejected. Mullick chose Louis Banks and L Vaidyanathan to blend the music correctly and arrange the final score, which was sung by M Balamuralikrishna, Pandit Joshi and Lata Mangeshkar.

Producer and director Kailash Surendranath filmed the opening sequence with Pandit Bhimsen Joshi at Pambar Falls in Kodaikanal, where Surendranath had previously filmed a famous ad for Liril soap (leading to the falls being known popularly as "Liril Falls"). With the help of an Air Marshal and an IAF helicopter, he shot the aerial view of the Taj Mahal. This led both Surendranath and the Air Marshal in to trouble. The video also features the Kolkata Metro and the Deccan Queen. Kamal Hassan's cameo was initially unplanned but he was included only because he accompanied M Balamuralikrishna for the shooting at the beach. At the request of Doordarshan, many actors agreed to be a part of the film, with only Naseeruddin Shah declining. While Kavita Krishnamurthy had recorded most of the initial track for the actresses to lip sync, Lata Mangeshkar made time in her schedule at the last minute and recorded the song in the studio, wearing a sari with a pallu in the colours of the Indian flag. The last shot of the film, featuring school children, was shot at Mullick's alma mater in Shimla.

Phir Mile Sur Mera Tumhara
Twenty years after the tune's debut, it was re-recorded with an updated cast for telecast on 26 January 2010 by Zoom TV. This version, titled "Phir Mile Sur Mera Tumhara", features Indian musicians, singers, sportspersons and film personalities from the current generation. The current version's 16 min 17 sec length exceeds the older 6 min 9 sec version and was directed by Kailash Surendranath who had produced the original version as well. The new version retains music composer/arranger Louis Banks. It attracted criticism in a large part of the population among them were the Sindhi community which were upset over the deletion of the Sindhi lines "Muhinjo sur tuhinje saan pyara mile jadein, geet asaanjo madhur tarano bane tadein" present in the original. Further criticism arose over the omission of notable personalities such as, A.P.J. Abdul Kalam, Sachin Tendulkar and Viswanathan Anand. It also failed to capture the soul and essence of the original version, focusing excessively on Bollywood actors, ignoring eminent personalities in other fields.

The new version featured the following people:
 Musicians: A. R. Rahman, Shankar–Ehsaan–Loy, Anoushka Shankar, Shivkumar Sharma, Rahul Sharma, Zakir Hussain, Bhupen Hazarika, Sivamani, L. Subramaniam, Amjad Ali Khan, Amaan Ali Khan, Ayaan Ali Khan, Louis Banks, Darshan Doshi, Siddharth Mahadevan
 Singers: Shreya Ghoshal, Gurdas Maan, Shaan, Kavita Krishnamurthy, KJ Yesudas, Vijay Yesudas, Sonu Nigam, Karthik (singer), N. C. Karunya, Shreya Ghoshal, Amitabh Bachchan.
 Actors: Amitabh Bachchan, Vikram, Suriya, Aishwarya Rai Bachchan, Abhishek Bachchan, Mahesh Babu, Juhi Chawla, Prosenjit Chatterjee, Rituparna Sengupta, Shilpa Shetty, Salman Khan, Deepika Padukone, Priyanka Chopra, Mammootty, Shobana, Sonali Kulkarni, Atul Kulkarni, Aamir Khan, Shahid Kapoor, Ranbir Kapoor, Shah Rukh Khan.
 Sportspeople: Abhinav Bindra, Bhaichung Bhutia, Mary Kom, Vijender Singh, Sushil Kumar, Pullela Gopichand, Saina Nehwal
 Others: Sand artist Sudarshan Pattnaik, choreographer Shiamak Davar, film director Karan Johar

References

External links
 
 

Indian patriotic songs
Lata Mangeshkar songs
Kavita Krishnamurthy songs